Beringovsky (masculine), Beringovskaya (feminine), or Beringovskoye (neuter) may refer to:
Beringovsky District, a former district of Chukotka Autonomous Okrug, Russia
Beringovsky (inhabited locality), an urban locality (a work settlement) in Chukotka Autonomous Okrug, Russia